The Battle of Lemo was fought during the Finnish War between Sweden and Russia on 19–20 June 1808 (Julian calendar 7–8 June).

On 19 June, about 2,500 Swedes landed at Lemo (Finnish:Lemu) in Kaarina in Southwest Finland, aided by the Swedish Navy. There, the Swedes intended to liberate Åbo (Finnish:Turku) from the Russians. The Swedish landing forces were commanded by Major General Eberhard von Vegesack. The Russian had about 3,600 men in the area under the command of Lieutenant General Karl Gustav von Baggovut.

Battle forces

Swedish

Russian

Overview
Major General von Vegesack started immediately to entrench the landing site. The main defense line was set along the terrain facing the open field. The guns deployed to the front of Ala-Lemo Manor house.  The gunboats that escorted the landing fleet were positioned at the strait so that they closed the strait and had a view to the battlefield.  The Russian troops were deployed in small units along the Turku-Vyborg main road.

Phase 1 (Sunday 19 June)

The initial phases of the operation were quite successful for the Swedes, who managed to advance several kilometers and eventually have Turku in sight. However, the units of the Libau Infantry Regiment with one gun launched the first Russian counterattack and they pushed the advanced Swedish troops back to the main defense line. Von Vegesack attacked immediately to the Russian center. 
The Russian commander Baggovut received reinforcements and he attacked with divided forces; 2 companies attacked on the right, 2 companies on the left, and 2 companies with the gun in the center. Lieutenant von Vegesack (the son of the general) found the Russian left flank open and attacked immediately. The Russians had to withdraw a few kilometers in defense. The Swedish troops followed.

Phase 2 (Monday 20 June)
Major General Nikolay Borozdin collected more reinforcements: 300 men from the Brest Infantry Regiment, two more guns, and one squadron of the Finland Dragoon Regiment. In the early morning the Libau Infantry Regiment made the Swedish troops retreat again back to the main defense line. Von Vegesack ordered all of the men from the nearby islands to the Lemo battlefield and strengthened the defense line.

Baggovut received the Pernov (Pärnu) Musketeer Regiment as additional reinforcement.  The Russian launched the whole front attack with bayonets; the Pernov Regiment on the right, the Libau Regiment in the center, and the Brest Regiment on the left. The Russian artillery set fire to the Ala-Lemo Manor house. The Swedes were forced to pull back and eventually evacuate to their ships. The fortifications at the shore and later the gunboats defended the fleeing Swedes. The Russian artillery moved to the shore and fired at the Swedish fleet. Von Vegesack pulled both the land and sea forces back to the Åland Islands.

After the battle the Russian reserve forces at Yli-Lemo were 2 companies from the Nevski Regiment and ½ squadron of the Finland Dragoon Regiment.

Legacy
In the summer of 2008 the monument  ("Dying soldier") by the sculptor Heidi Limnell was erected near the Yli-Lemo Manor house in memory of all soldiers killed in the battle of Lemo. The monument was inspired by The Tales of Ensign Stål, part: .

Notes, citations and sources

Notes

Citations

Sources

External links
Original Swedish text The Tales of Ensign Stål of the book, at Project Runeberg.
Battlemap June 19, 1808
Battlemap June 20, 1808
 Four Actions in Finland during the Russian-Swedish War of 1808-09
Russian Army uniforms during the Napoleonic Wars

See also
 Finnish War

Lemo
Lemo
1808 in Finland
Lemo
Lemo
History of Southwest Finland
June 1808 events